Las is a subdistrict of Wawer, in south-east Warsaw with a population of over 2.500 inhabitants.

History
The history of Las dates back to the 15th century (founded as a private noble village). Certain sources claim that in 17th century village was owned by a Polish noble Adam Kazanowski. In 1727 Las was incorporated into Dobra Wilanowskie.

In 1939 Las became a part of Wawer.

During the Second World War area of Las was under German occupation. As part of Polish resistance forces a squat of Peasants' Battalions operated in the area. During the Warsaw Uprising Nazi forces captured 50 locals.   Due to the ongoing offensive of the Red Army local residents were forces to build fortifications. Subsequently workers were sent to concentration camps located in today’s Austria (Mauthausen and Ebensee).  By the end of the war, as a result of intensive fights, most buildings in Las were entirely destroyed. 

After WWII Las was rebuild. In 1951, together with Wawer, Las became a part of Warsaw. In 1960 due to liquidation of Wawer as a separate subunit, it was incorporated to Praga Południe. In 1994, when Wawer reappeared on the map of Warsaw as a commune, Las once again became its subdistrict.

References

Neighbourhoods of Wawer